Our Lady of Consolation or Mary, Consoler of the Afflicted is a Roman Catholic title of the Blessed Virgin Mary. It dates back to the second century and is one of her earliest Marian titles of honor. The title Comforter of the afflicted is also used as an invocation in the Litany of Loreto.

History 
The origin of this invocation is derived from the Augustinian friars who propagated this particular devotion. Along with Saints Augustine, and Monica, Our Lady of Consolation is one of the three patrons of the Augustinian orders. The title  (Comforter of the Afflicted) is part of the Litany of Loreto, and is Augustinian in origin. Devotion to Our Lady of Consolation was propagated by the Augustinian monks. By the early 18th century the custom of asking for the final blessing before death in the name of Our Lady of Consolation was very popular.

In congregations of the Augustinian Order, the "Augustinian Rosary" is sometimes called the "Crown of Our Mother of Consolation". The traditional depiction of Our Mother of Consolation in Augustinian houses show Mary holding the Child Jesus on her lap. Both of them hold the Augustinian cincture in their hands.

Archconfraternity
The oldest and most celebrated of these Confraternities of the Cord is probably the Archconfraternity of Our Lady of Consolation, also called the Archconfraternity of the Cincture of Saint Monica, Saint Augustine and Saint Nicholas of Tolentino.

In 1439, the Augustinian Order obtained the faculty to set up the Confraternity of the Cincture for lay people. It was based on an Augustinian tradition which holds that Saint Monica in the fourth century was distraught with anxiety for her wayward son, Augustine, and that Mary gave her a sash which the Virgin wore, with the assurance that whoever wore this belt in her honour would receive her special consolation and protection. Later on, it was adopted by the Hermits of Saint Augustine as a distinctive part of their habit.

The confraternity of Our Lady of Consolation was founded in 1495 in Bologna, Italy. In 1575 both confraternities merged in a single Archconfraternity of Our Lady of Consolation and Cincture. Other similar confraternities were aggregated to the Archconfraternity in Bologna.

The annual feast of the Archconfraternity is 4 September. Members are obliged to wear a black leather belt, to fast on the vigil of the feast of Saint Augustine and to recite daily the "Little Rosary of Our Lady of Consolation" which is composed of thirteen couplets of beads. The essential prayers to be said are Our Father and Hail Mary repeated thirteen times after which is recited the Hail Holy Queen.

For the erection of and reception into this archconfraternity, special faculties must be had from the prior general. The headquarters of the society is the Church of Sant'Agostino, Rome where the body of Saint Monica lies.

Dates of veneration 

The feast of Our Lady of Consolation is observed in particular places, regions, parish churches, orders or religious institutes. 

 The Order of Saint Augustine observe it on September 4.  
 The Order of Friars Minor Conventual observe it on May 25 
 The Order of Saint Benedict on July 5.

In Malta, the feast is celebrated on the last Sunday of October with pyrotechnic displays by Our Lady of Consolation Fireworks Factory. The Feast Day in Rome for Our Lady of Consolation is January 31; in the United States it is the Saturday after the Feast of Saint Augustine (August 28).

Prominent images in various countries

Argentina 
Pope Benedict XVI granted a decree of canonical coronation towards the venerated 17th-century image of Our Lady of Consolation in Sumampa, Argentina, on 21 November 2009.

Belgium 
Pope Pius X granted a decree of pontifical coronation in 19 June 1907 towards a Pietà image dating from 1535 in the Franciscan church of Leuven. The image, also known as “Our Lady of Koorts” or “Our Lady of Fever” due to its longstanding claim to heal the sick, was renamed Our Lady of Consolation of the Afflicted by popular demand.

France 

Stanbrook Abbey was founded in 1623 at Cambrai as the monastery of "Our Lady of Consolation", for English Catholic expatriates.

 Pope Innocent X encouraged the devotion to Our Lady of Consolation by establishing a French confraternity in 1652.
 Pope Pius IX granted a canonical coronation to an image with the title of "Our Lady, Consoler of the Afflicted" in Verdelais on 2 July 1856, now enshrined in its titular Basilica. 
 Pope Pius X granted a decree of coronation to another image of Our Lady of Consolation in Hyeres on 21 June 1909.

The dioceses of Vannes, Valence, Montpelier, Laval, Nantes, Périgueux, Tours and many others, dedicated churches or chapels to Our Lady of Consolation.

Germany 
Our Lady Comforter of the Afflicted is venerated in the Marian Basilica of Kevelaer. In 1642 a copperplate engraving, representing Our Lady of Luxembourg, was installed in a sanctuary erected the same year. It is one of the best visited Catholic pilgrimage locations in north-western Europe.

 Pope Benedict XIV — granted its pilgrims abundant indulgences on 24 August 1740. 
 Pope Gregory XVI — extended more titles to the image on 14 June 1840. 
 Pope Leo XIII — granted a decree of pontifical coronation on 20 July 1890 and was crowned on 1 June 1892.
 Pope Pius XI — issued a Pontifical decree In Civitate Appellata which raised her sanctuary to the status of Basilica on 23 April 1923, the decree was signed by Vatican Secretary of State, Cardinal Pietro Gasparri. 
 Pope John Paul II — visited the shrine on 2 May 1987.

Italy  

The Order of Saint Benedict were the first monastics to settle in Turin. A church at the site, probably dedicated to the Blessed Virgin Mary, stood adjacent to the ancient Roman walls of the city. Pious legends claim that Saint Eusebius of Vercelli brought back an icon of Our Lady of Consolation when he was returning from exile in Egypt in 363. This icon was presented to the city of Turin. Later on Bishop Maximus of Turin established a small shrine to house the icon in a church dedicated to Saint Andrew. 

Pope Pius X granted a decree of pontifical coronation towards the image on 18 June 1904. Its ensemble of twenty-four stars was donated by former Queen of Italy, Margherita of Savoy while the rest of its regalia were donated from the princes of Savoy and noble ladies of Turin. The decree was granted to and executed by the Prefect of the Sacred Congregation of the Index, Cardinal Vincenzo Vannutelli in a public religious event. 

The icon became the object of great veneration, and the church was later dedicated as Santuario della Consolata, later raised to the status of Minor Basilica by Pope Pius X on 7 April 1906. 

A famed Catholic priest, Joseph Marello (Age 19), contracted the Typhus disease.  He attributed his recovery to Our Lady of Consolation and recovered. In 1878, he founded the Oblates of Saint Joseph.

In the 20th century, the rector of the Santuario della Consolata, Giuseppe Allamano, founded the Congregation of Clerics of Consolata Missionaries in 1902. These Christian missionaries later brought the devotion of Our Lady of Consolation to the Negroid peoples of Africa.

Japan 
The Augustinian church located in the Shiroyama district of Nagasaki, Japan, is dedicated to Our Mother of Consolation.

Luxembourg 
The devotion to Our Lady of Luxembourg, Comforter of the Afflicted, was initiated by the Jesuits in 1624 and led to the election of Our Lady as the protectress of the city in 1666 and of the duchy in 1678. After the destruction of the old pilgrimage chapel at the time of the French Revolution, the statue of Our Lady of Luxembourg was moved to the former Saint Peter church, today renamed Notre-Dame Cathedral in Luxembourg City. Statues depicting her can be found in niches in buildings throughout the city of Luxembourg. From there the devotion was adopted by the English Benedictine nuns of Cambrai. It is solemnly celebrated during the Oktav.

Malta
In the 1700s, members of the Augustinian Order introduced the devotion to Our Lady of Consolation to the island of Malta. On 1 December 1722, the Prior General of the Augustinian Order, Thomas Cervioni, issued the decree for the erection of the Confraternity of Our Lady of Consolation in the church of Saint Mark, run by the Augustinians at Rabat, Malta. By this time the custom of asking for the final blessing before death in the name of Our Lady of Consolation was very popular, and the friars were given a dispensation to leave the monastery at any time to confer it. Processions in Our Lady's honor were suspended during the French occupation of 1798 to discourage the gathering of crowds.

Philippine islands 

Pope John Paul II granted the image of Our Lady of Consolation and Cincture enshrined in San Agustin Church in Manila, Philippines a pontifical decree of canonical coronation on 12 June 1999. The coronation took place on 4 September 2000.

Poland 
Several images of the Blessed Virgin Mary under the title of Our Lady of Consolation have been honored by several popes and are venerated throughout Poland. 

 Pope John XXIII — granted a decree of coronation for Nowy Sącz on 10 August 1963.

 Pope Paul VI — granted a decree of coronation for the namesake Marian images:
 in Dąbrówka Kościelna, canonically crowned on 15 June 1969.
 In Golina, canonically crowned on 23 August 1970.
 In Szamotuły, canonically crowned on 20 September 1970.
 In Jodłowa, canonically crowned on 31 August 1975. 
 In the Parish of the Nativity of Stara Blotnica, canonically crowned on 21 August 1977.

 Pope John Paul II — granted a decree of coronation for the namesake Marian images: 
 In Orchówek crowned by pontifical decree on 2 September 1990.
 In Pasierbiec, canonically crowned on 28 August 1993.
 In the Franciscan Church and monastery of Gniezno, image canonically crowned on 3 June 1997.
In the Church of the Annunciation of Miedzna, icon under the title "Comforter of the Afflicted", canonically crowned on 22 June 1997.
In the Church of the Holy Trinity in Lubiszewo Tczewskie, canonically crowned on 31 August 1997.
In the Church of Saint Catherine of Alexandria of Kraków, image canonically crowned on 9 December 2000 (Great Jubilee Year).

 Pope Francis — granted a decree of coronation for the namesake Marian images:
 In Wiele, Pomeranian Voivodeship,  Calvary chapel, which was canonically crowned on 28 May 2017.  
 In Kombornia, canonically crowned on 11 June 2017.
 In the Sea Basilica of Gdynia, image canonically crowned on 12 June 2022.

Spain 
 Pope Paul VI —  granted a canonical coronation for the image of Our Lady of Consolation enshrined at Utrera, Spain on 1 May 1964. 

 Pope Francis — granted a decree of coronation towards another namesake image in Valdepeñas in 1 June 2019.

United Kingdom

The Shrine of Our Lady of Consolation in West Grinstead, in the Diocese of Arundel and Brighton dates from 1876 and is the first shrine in honour of the Blessed Virgin Mary to be established in England since before the Protestant Reformation. In Perth, Scotland, at the Church of Saint John the Baptist exists an altar inscribed to "Saint Mary of Consolation".

With the approval of the Archbishop of Turin in northern Italy, the new church was affiliated to the original sanctuary of Our Lady of Consolation, and a painting, closely resembling the painting in the Santuario della Consolata of Turin, attached with both indulgences and privileges was brought to West Grinstead. 

Pope Leo XIII granted this venerated image a decree of pontifical coronation in 12 July 1893.

United States of America 
In 1848, Luxembourg immigrants began to settle in the area around Dacada, Wisconsin. The eldest statue of Our Lady of Consolation in the United States was brought by a Luxembourg immigrant, Anna Margaret Deppiesse, in 1849 and later donated to Saint Nicholas Church.

During the American Civil War, three parishioners of Saint Augustine's Parish in Leopold, Indiana, fought for the North and were imprisoned at Andersonville Prison. Former Belgian nationals, Henry Devillez, Isidore Naviaux and Lambert Rogier, vowed that if they survived, one of them would make a pilgrimage to Luxembourg and obtain a copy of the statue of Our Lady of Consolation that stood in their ancestral church. Rogier went to Luxembourg in 1867 and upon his return enshrined it in Saint Augustine's, where it now stands to the left of the main altar. In September 2013, Archbishop Joseph W. Tobin of Indianapolis dedicated a larger outdoor garden shrine.

One of the two main celebrations held each year in the Tacony section of Philadelphia were Our Lady of Consolation's Feast Day Parade. (The other is Memorial Day.) Each July statues of the saints were paraded through the streets of the neighborhood.

The Franciscan Order also has a devotion to the Blessed Virgin Mary under this honorific title, centered at the Basilica and National Shrine of Our Lady of Consolation in Ohio.

Venezuela 
Pope John XXIII granted a pontifical decree of coronation on 9 November 1959  towards the namesake image enshrined at the Basilica of Our Lady of Consolation, Táriba, Venezuela. The coronation was executed on 12 March 1967.

References

Titles of Mary